David Albert DeBusschere (October 16, 1940 – May 14, 2003) was an American professional National Basketball Association (NBA) player and coach and Major League Baseball (MLB) player. He played for the Chicago White Sox of MLB in 1962 and 1963 and in the NBA for the Detroit Pistons from 1962 through 1968 and for the New York Knicks from 1968 to 1974. He was also the head coach for the Pistons from 1964 through 1967.

DeBusschere was inducted into the Naismith Memorial Basketball Hall of Fame in 1983. In 1996, DeBusschere was named as one of the 50 greatest players in NBA history. In October 2021, DeBusschere was again honored as one of the league's greatest players of all time by being named to the NBA 75th Anniversary Team.

Early life
DeBusschere was born in Detroit to parents Peter Marcell and Dorothy DeBusschere. He attended Austin Catholic Preparatory School and inspired the "White Shirted Legion" (the tradition of wearing white shirts to the school's games to make fans more visible). As a junior, he was named all-state, and in his senior year of 1957–58, in just the school's third year of organized basketball, he led his team to the Michigan Class A high school basketball championship, scoring 32 points despite fouling out midway through the fourth quarter as the Friars defeated Benton Harbor High School and DeBusschere's future NBA rival forward Chet Walker.

College career
DeBusschere starred in both basketball and baseball at the University of Detroit. He averaged 24 points a game in basketball, helping Detroit reach the National Invitation Tournament twice and the NCAA basketball tournament once. He also pitched the Titans to three NCAA baseball tournament berths.

Baseball career

In 1962, DeBusschere was signed by the Chicago White Sox as an amateur free agent. He was a pitcher for the White Sox from 1962 to 1963. He pitched a shutout on August 13, 1963, against the Cleveland Indians, giving up six hits, one walk and striking out three. In 22 career at-bats, he had only one hit, a single off Bennie Daniels on July 17, 1963. He pitched in the White Sox's minor league system for two more seasons before giving up pitching to focus on both playing and coaching basketball.

He is one of only 13 athletes to have played in both the National Basketball Association and Major League Baseball. The 13 are: Danny Ainge, Frank Baumholtz, Hank Biasatti, Gene Conley, Chuck Connors, DeBusschere, Dick Groat, Steve Hamilton, Mark Hendrickson, Cotton Nash, Ron Reed, Dick Ricketts and Howie Schultz.

Basketball career

Detroit Pistons 
DeBusschere was selected by the Detroit Pistons in 1962 NBA draft as a territorial draft selection. During his rookie season, he averaged 12.7 points and 8.7 rebounds per game, and was later named to the NBA All-Rookie Team. However, DeBusschere was injured during his second season and only played in 15 games, resulting in the Pistons finishing with a disappointing record of 23–59.

In the 1964–1965 season, at the age of 24, he was given the position of player-coach for the Pistons, and thus became the youngest-ever coach in league history. However, this stint as coach was not successful and he became a full-time player. During the 1968–1969 season, DeBusschere was traded to the New York Knicks for Walt Bellamy and Howard Komives.

While a member of the Pistons, DeBusschere appeared as himself on the April 29, 1963 episode of the game show To Tell the Truth. He received two votes.

New York Knicks 

DeBusschere, along with future Hall of Famers Willis Reed, Bill Bradley and Walt Frazier, became an NBA champion when the Knicks defeated the Los Angeles Lakers in the 1970 NBA Finals. With Earl Monroe in the backcourt, they became champions again in 1973, beating the Lakers 4–1 in the finals.

DeBusschere was elected to the Naismith Memorial Basketball Hall of Fame in 1983 after a 12-year career (1962–1974) in which he averaged 16.1 points and 11 rebounds while being named to eight NBA All-Star teams. He became a member of the NBA 50th Anniversary All-Time Team in 1996. He was renowned for his physical style of play and tenacious defense, and he was named to the NBA All-Defensive first team six times.

Life after basketball
DeBusschere retired as a player in 1974, and his no. 22 jersey was retired by the Knicks, though not until many years later; it is thought the delay was due to his taking a front office job with the rival New York Nets of the American Basketball Association upon his retirement. The next year DeBusschere became the ABA's commissioner for the 1975–76 season, which would be the last for the league. He helped bring about the merger between the NBA and the ABA that year. He was later the assistant coach and director of basketball operations of the Knicks during the 1980s, when he drafted fellow Knicks legend Patrick Ewing with the first overall selection in 1985.

DeBusschere and some partners purchased Ring magazine in 1979.

DeBusschere authored a book entitled The Open Man, a chronicle of the New York Knicks' 1969–70 championship season.

Death
In May 2003, DeBusschere collapsed on a Manhattan street from a heart attack and was pronounced dead at New York University Hospital. DeBusschere was interred at Saint Joseph's Church Cemetery in Garden City, New York. DeBusschere, who lived in Garden City, was survived by his wife, Gerri (who died of cancer in 2009), sons Peter and Dennis, and daughter Michelle.

In his honor, the University of Detroit Mercy inaugurated the Dave DeBusschere Scholarship in 2003. It provides support to two student-athletes that must have a minimum grade point average of 3.0 and have demonstrated exceptional leadership skills.

NBA career statistics

Regular season

|-
| style="text-align:left;"|
| style="text-align:left;"|Detroit
| 80 ||  || 29.4 || .430 ||  || .718 || 8.7 || 2.6 ||  ||  || 12.7
|-
| style="text-align:left;"|
| style="text-align:left;"|Detroit
| 15 ||  || 20.3 || .391 ||  || .581 || 7.0 || 1.5 ||  ||  || 8.6
|-
| style="text-align:left;"|
| style="text-align:left;"|Detroit
| 79 ||  || 35.1 || .425 ||  || .700 || 11.1 || 3.2 ||  ||  || 16.7
|-
| style="text-align:left;"|
| style="text-align:left;"|Detroit
| 79 ||  || 34.1 || .408 ||  || .659 || 11.6 || 2.6 ||  ||  || 16.4
|-
| style="text-align:left;"|
| style="text-align:left;"|Detroit
| 78 ||  || 37.1 || .415 ||  || .705 || 11.8 || 2.8 ||  ||  || 18.2
|-
| style="text-align:left;"|
| style="text-align:left;"|Detroit
| 80 ||  || 39.1 || .442 ||  || .664 || 13.5 || 2.3 ||  ||  || 17.9
|-
| style="text-align:left;"|
| style="text-align:left;"|Detroit
| 29 ||  || 37.7 || .447 ||  || .723 || 12.2 || 2.2 ||  ||  || 16.3
|-
| style="text-align:left;"|
| style="text-align:left;"|New York
| 47 ||  || 39.4 || .442 ||  || .682 || 11.4 || 2.7 ||  ||  || 16.4
|-
| style="text-align:left; background:#afe6ba;"|
| style="text-align:left;"|New York
| 79 ||  || 33.3 || .451 ||  || .688 || 10.0 || 2.5 ||  ||  || 14.6
|-
| style="text-align:left;"|
| style="text-align:left;"|New York
| 81 ||  || 35.7 || .421 ||  || .696 || 11.1 || 2.7 ||  ||  || 15.6
|-
| style="text-align:left;"|
| style="text-align:left;"|New York
| 80 ||  || 38.4 || .427 ||  || .728 || 11.3 || 3.6 ||  ||  || 15.4
|-
| style="text-align:left; background:#afe6ba;"|
| style="text-align:left;"|New York
| 77 ||  || 36.7 || .435 ||  || .746 || 10.2 || 3.4 ||  ||  || 16.3
|-
| style="text-align:left;"|
| style="text-align:left;"|New York
| 71 ||  || 38.0 || .461 ||  || .756 || 10.7 || 3.6 || .9 || .5 || 18.1
|- class="sortbottom"
| style="text-align:center;" colspan="2"|Career
| 875 ||  || 35.7 || .432 ||  || .699 || 11.0 || 2.9 || .9 || .5 || 16.1
|- class="sortbottom"
| style="text-align:center;" colspan="2"|All-Star
| 8 || 1 || 20.9 || .457 ||  || .750 || 6.4 || 1.4 || .1 || .0 || 9.6

Playoffs

|-
| style="text-align:left;"|1963
| style="text-align:left;"|Detroit
| 4 ||  || 39.8 || .424 ||  || .682 || 15.8 || 1.5 ||  ||  || 20.0
|-
| style="text-align:left;"|1968
| style="text-align:left;"|Detroit
| 6 ||  || 43.8 || .425 ||  || .578 || 16.2 || 2.2 ||  ||  || 19.3
|-
| style="text-align:left;"|1969
| style="text-align:left;"|New York
| 10 ||  || 41.9 || .351 ||  || .820 || 14.8 || 3.3 ||  ||  || 16.3
|-
| style="text-align:left; background:#afe6ba;"|1970
| style="text-align:left;"|New York
| 19 ||  || 36.9 || .421 ||  || .662 || 11.6 || 2.4 ||  ||  || 16.1
|-
| style="text-align:left;"|1971
| style="text-align:left;"|New York
| 12 ||  || 40.7 || .416 ||  || .659 || 13.0 || 1.8 ||  ||  || 16.4
|-
| style="text-align:left;"|1972
| style="text-align:left;"|New York
| 16 ||  || 38.5 || .450 ||  || .750 || 12.1 || 2.3 ||  ||  || 16.6
|-
| style="text-align:left; background:#afe6ba;"|1973
| style="text-align:left;"|New York
| 17 ||  || 37.1 || .442 ||  || .775 || 10.5 || 3.4 ||  ||  || 15.6
|-
| style="text-align:left;"|1974
| style="text-align:left;"|New York
| 12 ||  || 33.7 || .380 ||  || .621 || 8.3 || 3.2 || .6 || .3 || 12.0
|- class="sortbottom"
| style="text-align:center;" colspan="2"|Career
| 96 ||  || 38.4 || .416 ||  || .698 || 12.0 || 2.6 || .6 || .3 || 16.0

See also
 List of National Basketball Association career rebounding leaders
 List of NCAA Division I men's basketball players with 30 or more rebounds in a game
 List of NCAA Division I men's basketball career rebounding leaders

References

External links

 Dave DeBusschere at SABR (Baseball BioProject)
 Dave DeBusschere Legends profile at NBA.com

1940 births
2003 deaths
All-American college men's basketball players
American Basketball Association executives
American men's basketball coaches
American men's basketball players
American people of Belgian descent
Baseball players from Michigan
Basketball coaches from Michigan
Basketball players from Detroit
Catholics from Michigan
Chicago White Sox players
Detroit Pistons draft picks
Detroit Pistons head coaches
Detroit Pistons players
Detroit Mercy Titans baseball players
Detroit Mercy Titans men's basketball players
Indianapolis Indians players
Major League Baseball pitchers
Naismith Memorial Basketball Hall of Fame inductees
National Basketball Association All-Stars
National Basketball Association players with retired numbers
New York Knicks players
Parade High School All-Americans (boys' basketball)
Power forwards (basketball)
Small forwards
The Ring (magazine) people